Cristóbal Lechuga Baeza, Spain ca 1557 - 1622) was a soldier and mathematician, known to have published a treaty of artillery and fortification.

Life 
Little is known of his life before 1585. As explained by himself, he entered   the army when he only was 18 years old. In 1585, he was sergeant in Francisco of Bobadilla's army in to Flanders; in 1590 he  was imprisoned for some time for participation in a mutiny.

From 1593, as an artillery officer in the Spanish army, he took part in the wars of Spain against Henry IV of France and against the Flemish rebels. He took part in the sieges of La Chapelle (1594), Doullens, Cambray (1595), Calais (1596) and in the defense of Amiens, occupied by the Spanish army in 1597. In this period he met his main sponsor: Pedro Enríquez of Acevedo, count of Fuentes, who had been appointed governor of Milan in  1600.

From 1600, as inspector of fortificacions of the Duchy of Milan, he carried out numerous secret missions for the  Spain; He also  took part in the foundation of the Academy of Artillery of Milan, for what Fuentes had obtained the approval of the king,  Philip III of Spain From Milan, he recommended that Spain create a similar academy in Madrid.

The death of the count of Fuentes in 1610 left Lechuga without any political support. Yet, in 1613 he was  transferred to the Royal Navy  based in Cadiz and he was appointed lieutenant general..

In 1614 he took part in the expedition against La Mamora, now Mehdya (Morocco), and was appointed governor  once the place was  conquered,  and  commissioned  to build strong fortifications there.

In 1620 he was faced with aggression from the Moroccans of the area; their siege was broken by reinforcements from Cadiz in 1621. In September 1622  Diego of Escobedo was appointed  governor of La Mamora as his replacement; it is not known if the appointment was due to the death or the resignation of Cristobal Lechuga.

However, in the years 1618-1619, perhaps during a leave in  his natal village, Baeza, he erected a family chapel in the Romanesque church of  Santa Cruz, where he wanted to be buried. This chapel-sepulchre was moved to Baeza's  Cathedral, when the church was "desamortitzada" in 1835 and we can see it, still today, in this place.

Works 
Lechuga Is known to have written two works of military technics:
 Discurso en el que trata del cargo de Maestro de Campo General (Milan, 1603), probably written while he was in Flandes, but published some years after. The work is written to  show that tradition and antiquity can not be the criteria for evaluating  the merit of military officers, but rather their professional preparation and technical capacity.
 Discurso en el que trata de la Artilleria con un tratado de Fortificación (Milan, 1611). The book continues his emphasis on the professionalism of the military. He considers  that the Artillery is the most important   arm of a modern army,  he discusses it more deeply, recommending normalization of calibration, building and location of the pieces, etc. The discussion is based on   a scientific and technical point of view.

References

Bibliography 
 Giannini, Massimo Carlo. «Pratica delle Armi e istruzione militare: Cristóbal Lechuga ufficiale e scrittore nella Milano di inizio Seicento». In: José María Merry Peyrón, M. Rizzo, G. Mazzocchi (eds.). La espada y la pluma: il mondo militare nella Lombardia spagnola cinquecentesca (in Italian). Mauro Baroni Editore, 2000, p. 483-515. . 
 González de León, Fernando. The Road To Rocroi: Class, Culture and Command in the Spanish Army of Flanders (in English). Leiden: Brill, 2009. . 
 González de León, Fernando. "Doctors of the Military Discipline": Technical Expertise and the Paradigm of the Spanish Soldier in the Early Modern Period (in English). Sixteenth Century Journal. Vol 27, No 1, 1996. , .
 Martínez Laínez, Fernando. Una Pica en Flandes: La epopeya del Camino Español (in Spanish). Madrid: EDAF, 2007. .]
 Martínez Laínez, Fernando; Sánchez de Toca, José María. Los Tercios de España: La infantería legendaria (in Spanish). Madrid: EDAF, 2006. .
 de los Ríos, Vicente. "Discurso sobre los ilustres autores e inventores de la Artillería" (in (Spanish)). Memorias de la Real Academia de la Historia [Madrid], vol. IV, 1805, p. 1-65.

External links 
 Lechuga, Cristóbal. "Discurso del capitan Cristoual Lechuga, en el que trata de la artillería, y de todo lo necesario a ella, con un Tratado of Fortificación" (in Spanish). Google books, 1611. [Query: 8 November 2015].
 "Cristóbal Lechuga y García" (in Spanish). The Época of los Tercios. [Query: 10 November 2015].

16th-century Spanish mathematicians
Spanish military engineers
1550s births
1622 deaths
Expatriates of Spain in the Holy Roman Empire